Destination: Love - Live! At Cold Rice is the debut album by The Make-Up.

On the LP version of the album, the A-Side is called the "Gospel Yeh-Yeh Side," and the B-Side the "Liberation Theology Side." On the CD version these sides were combined, but labeled separately in the liner notes.

Bassist Michelle Mae is featured on the cover.

Track listing (LP)
Gospel Yeh-Yeh Side (Side A)
"Intro: Hold It" − 1:38
"Here Comes the Judge" − 3:05
"You + I vs. The World" − 2:58
"They Live by Night" − 2:00
"Bring the Birds Down" − 2:25
"Don't Mind the Mind" − 2:06
"Evidence Is Everywhere" − 2:11
"We Can't Be Contained" − 3:22

Liberation Theology Side (Side B)
"Introductions" − 1:23
"Don't Step on the Children" − 2:00
"How Pretty can U Get?" − 2:02
"R U A Believer Pt. II" − 2:04
"International Airport" − 2:29
"We Gotta Get off this Rock" − 1:46
"So ... Chocolatey/Destination: Love" − 4:38
"Outro: Hold It" − 1:18

References

1996 debut albums
The Make-Up albums